The Twilight Saga: Breaking Dawn – Part 2 is a 2012 American romantic fantasy film directed by Bill Condon. It was written by Melissa Rosenberg, based on the 2008 novel Breaking Dawn by Stephenie Meyer. The sequel to The Twilight Saga: Breaking Dawn – Part 1 (2011), it is the fifth installment in The Twilight Saga film series. The film stars Kristen Stewart, Robert Pattinson, and Taylor Lautner, reprising their roles as Bella Swan, Edward Cullen, and Jacob Black, respectively; Mackenzie Foy portrays Renesmee Cullen. The ensemble cast includes Billy Burke, Peter Facinelli, Elizabeth Reaser, Kellan Lutz, Nikki Reed, Jackson Rathbone, Ashley Greene, Michael Sheen, and Dakota Fanning.

Summit Entertainment announced that Breaking Dawn would be adapted into a two-part film on June 10, 2010. Principal photography for both parts began on November 1, 2010, and wrapped on April 22, 2011. The second part was shot in Baton Rouge and New Orleans, Louisiana; and Vancouver, Canada.

The Twilight Saga: Breaking Dawn – Part 2 premiered in Los Angeles on November 12, 2012, and was theatrically released in the United States on November 16, by Summit Entertainment. The film grossed $829 million worldwide, becoming the sixth-highest-grossing film of 2012, the highest-grossing film of The Twilight Saga series, and the highest-grossing film released by Summit Entertainment.

Plot

The movie continues from the events of the previous film, as Bella, who has just given birth, awakens from her human-to-vampire transformation. After Edward helps her satisfy her initial thirst, Bella is introduced to her daughter Renesmee. The rest of the Cullens and Jacob stay nearby, and when Jacob acts possessively towards Renesmee, Bella learns he has imprinted on her, making her furious until he explains he has no ill intentions.

Meanwhile, Bella's father, Charlie, has been trying to contact the Cullens for updates on Bella's health. Carlisle announces that they have to leave Forks, Washington, to protect their identities - especially because of Charlie. Jacob, desperate not to lose Renesmee, visits Charlie and tells him that Bella is alive and well, but that she had to change in order to get better. Jacob also tells him he doesn't live in the world he thinks he does, and then reveals his wolf form to him. Charlie goes to the Cullen house to see Bella and meet Renesmee. He accepts that Bella is now recovered and this is her chosen life, but he does not know what has changed her or where Renesmee came from, but she's 'adopted'.

Several months pass with Carlisle monitoring Renesmee's rapid growth. On an outing in the woods, a bitter Irina sees Renesmee from a distance and assumes she's an immortal child. Immortal children were vampires who were changed in childhood, and because they could not be trained nor restrained, they slaughtered entire villages. The creation of such children is outlawed by the Volturi and anyone caught with one is to be executed.

Irina goes to the Volturi, reporting what she has seen. Alice gets a vision of the Volturi and Irina coming to kill the Cullens and instructs the others to gather as many witnesses as they can to testify that Renesmee is not an immortal child. Alice and Jasper then leave to gather evidence of this. The Cullens begin to summon witnesses, such as the Denali family. One of the Denalis, Eleazar, later discovers that Bella has a special ability: a powerful mental shield that had protected her from Edward's mind-reading even when she was human, which she is taught to extend to protect others from vampire powers.

The Volturi, led by Aro, arrive in Forks prepared for battle. Seeing the large group of vampires (the Cullens and their witnesses) and wolves, they stop their procession. They are able to prove to Aro that Renesmee is not an immortal child; however, the Volturi are eager to add the gifted members of the Cullen coven to the guard, so they execute Irina in an attempt to provoke a battle. Before a fight breaks out, Alice and Jasper return and Alice shows Aro her visions of the future.

In this violent vision, she and Jasper are arrested for attacking Aro after Alice finds out he will not change his decision and kicks him in the face. Carlisle tries to save them but is murdered by Aro. Jasper is beheaded by Demetri and Jane. Alice and Sam together avenge Jasper by killing Jane. Caius is partially beheaded by Tanya (a member of the Denalis) as revenge for Irina's execution. Seth is killed by Felix. Leah saves Esme's life but loses hers in the process. Marcus welcomes his death as he is torn to pieces by Vladimir and Stefan. Aro tries to kill Edward but a joint effort from Bella and Edward kills him. The vision ends with Bella burning Aro's detached head as other Volturi members try to grab her from behind.

Aro, despite being afraid of the vision future, still wants to execute Renesmee as she might become savage. Alice and Jasper reveal their final witness, Nahuel, a half-human half-vampire just like Renesmee. He proves that he is not a threat, supporting the notion that Renesmee is not one either. The Volturi unhappily leave, Aro fearfully explaining that there will be no battle today.

Back at the Cullen home, Alice glimpses the future, seeing Edward and Bella greeting Jacob and a fully matured Renesmee, also a couple, on a sun-dappled beach. Edward reads Alice's mind and feels relieved that Renesmee has Jacob to protect her. Alone in the meadow, Bella pushes her mental shield away and finally allows Edward to see into her mind, showing him every moment they have shared together. They kiss after Bella tells him, "nobody has ever loved anybody as much as I love you", and he says "with one exception."

Cast

Kristen Stewart as Bella Cullen
Robert Pattinson as Edward Cullen
Taylor Lautner as Jacob Black
Mackenzie Foy as Renesmee Cullen
Ashley Greene as Alice Cullen
Jackson Rathbone as Jasper Hale
Peter Facinelli as Carlisle Cullen
Elizabeth Reaser as Esme Cullen
Kellan Lutz as Emmett Cullen
Nikki Reed as Rosalie Hale
Billy Burke as Charlie Swan
Maggie Grace as Irina
Michael Sheen as Aro
Jamie Campbell Bower as Caius
Dakota Fanning as Jane
Christopher Heyerdahl as Marcus
Casey LaBow as Kate
MyAnna Buring as Tanya
Lee Pace as Garrett
Christian Camargo as Eleazar
Mía Maestro as Carmen
Noel Fisher as Vladimir
Joe Anderson as Alistair
Cameron Bright as Alec
Angela Sarafyan as Tia
Rami Malek as Benjamin
Booboo Stewart as Seth Clearwater
Daniel Cudmore as Felix
Judith Shekoni as Zafrina
Charlie Bewley as Demetri
J. D. Pardo as Nahuel
Wendell Pierce as J. Jenks
Julia Jones as Leah Clearwater
Lateef Crowder as Santiago
Andrea Powell as Sasha
Billy Wagenseller as Vasilii
Toni Trucks as Mary
Andrea Gabriel as Kebi
Chaske Spencer as Sam Uley
Marisa Quinn as Huilen
Omar Metwally as Amun
Valorie Curry as Charlotte
Tracey Heggins as Senna
Marlane Barnes as Maggie
Guri Weinberg as Stefan
Erik Odom as Peter
Lisa Howard as Siobhan
Bill Tangradi as Randall
Patrick Brennan as Liam
Amadou Ly as Henri
Janelle Froehlich as Yvette
Masami Kosaka as Toshiro

Gil Birmingham, Sarah Clarke, Michael Welch, Anna Kendrick, Christian Serratos, Justin Chon, Cam Gigandet, Edi Gathegi, Rachelle Lefevre, Kiowa Gordon, Tyson Houseman, Alex Meraz, Bronson Pelletier, Graham Greene, Tinsel Korey, Alex Rice, Xavier Samuel, Jodelle Ferland, Bryce Dallas Howard, and Carolina Virguez from the previous films make archival cameo appearances during the pre-credits montage accompanied by a duet version of Christina Perri’s “A Thousand Years” with Steve Kazee as the second voice.

Production

Development
On June 10, 2010, Summit Entertainment announced that a two-part adaptation of the novel Breaking Dawn would start filming in November and made clear that all major actors would return for both parts.

Pre-production
By August 2010, screenwriter Melissa Rosenberg said that the scripts for Part 1 and 2 were 75 to 85 percent completed. She found the greatest challenge in writing the scripts to be the final sequence of Part 2, explaining, "The final battle sequence is a big challenge because it lasts 25 pages. It's almost an entire three-act story in and of itself. You have to track [keep it all in one setting] hundreds of characters. It's an enormous challenge to choreograph on the page and for Bill [Condon] to choreograph on the stage." She had written various drafts of the scene but, at the time, hadn't revised or discussed them with Condon yet. She said, "That's the next big hurdle to sit down with the stunt coordinator and create the ballet. It's a lot of work. I'm exhausted, but we're intent on making them the best scripts yet." Producer Wyck Godfrey called Part 2 "an action film in terms of life-and-death stakes" and said that in Part 1 "there are the pangs of newlywed tension that occur that are relatable even in a fantasy film. Marriage is not quite the experience that they thought it was."

Godfrey considered releasing the second film in 3D to differentiate between the time before and after Bella becomes a vampire, an idea originally proposed for The Twilight Saga: Eclipse, but said that the decision was up to Condon. However, he said that if the second film were to be released in 3D, he would like to shoot it with the proper equipment in "real" 3D as was done with Avatar (2009), not convert it into 3D in post-production as was done with Clash of the Titans (2010).

Filming
Principal photography started on November 1, 2010, and wrapped on April 22, 2011, ending the franchise's three years of production since March 2008. Filming was shot on location in Baton Rouge and New Orleans, Louisiana; and Vancouver, Canada. Filming also occurred at Raleigh Studios in Baton Rouge.

On the subject of the final day and her final moment as Bella, Stewart stated, "After that scene, my true final scene, I felt like I could shoot up into the night sky and every pore of my body would shoot light. I felt lighter than I've ever felt in my life."

In April 2012, the crew and some of the cast, including Pattinson and Stewart, returned for reshoots to pick up some additional shots for technical work. These re-shoots did not include any new scenes or dialogue.

Special effects
Tippett Studio first began working on the CGI (computer-generated imagery) wolves in February 2009 for The Twilight Saga: New Moon, and the look of the creatures has evolved, becoming more photo-real over the course of the saga, with the input of three different directors. "It's a subtle balance of just how anthropomorphic these wolves are," says Eric Leven. "Bill (Condon) wanted to make sure that we had a sense of the human or the shapeshifter in there. Finding that balance of how much of a human performance versus an animal performance was important for Bill."

Leven adds, "Bill has always treated the wolves as characters and never as computer-generated things, and directs them in the same way he'd direct any actor. He would always give us direction like Sam should be angrier. It's the best way to work. His treating these creatures as characters, instead of just computer bits, was really great."

"Because we've been working on this franchise for such a prolonged period of time, we've been able to improve the look from show to show," comments Phil Tippett. "Wolves generally are pretty darn clean and since Bill wanted the wolves rangier, that means a lot more fur matting and clumping, like they've lived out in the woods. We edged towards something a bit more feral."

"However, there is also a balance between look and technology," adds Tippett. "The body count of the wolves escalates and because we're adding a great deal more hair to get the right texture, that fur really ups the rendering time. We've gone from four wolves to eight to twelve, to sixteen in Part 2. So we have to be very careful about that balance because it takes hundreds of hours to render each wolf."

Music

It was revealed in January 2012 that the soundtrack for Part 2 had already started production. Confirmed for the soundtrack in advance were "Heart of Stone" by Iko, which plays when Edward and Bella are talking in the cottage after finding Alice's note and "Where I Come From" by Passion Pit, which will play when Bella wakes up from her transformation. The lead single from the soundtrack is "The Forgotten", performed by the American rock band Green Day. "A Thousand Years, Pt. 2" by the American singer Christina Perri is also featured on the soundtrack album.

Carter Burwell, the composer of Twilight and Breaking Dawn: Part 1, returned to score the final installment of the series.

Release

Box office
The Twilight Saga: Breaking Dawn – Part 2 earned $292 million in North America and $537 million in other territories, for a worldwide total of $829.6 million. The film is the sixth-highest-grossing film of 2012, and the highest-grossing film of the Twilight series. It had a $340.9 million worldwide opening, which was the eighth-largest ever, the largest for the Twilight franchise, and the largest for a film released outside the summer period.

In North America, the film grossed $30.4 million in Thursday night and midnight showings, achieving the third-highest midnight gross and the highest midnight gross of the franchise. Breaking Dawn – Part 2 made $71.2 million on its opening day, which is the sixth-highest opening- and single-day gross as well as the third-highest of the franchise. For its opening weekend, the movie earned $141.1 million, which is the 13th-highest-grossing opening weekend of all time, the second-highest-grossing of the franchise, the third-largest November opening, and the fourth-largest opening of 2012. It retained first place in its second weekend by dropping 69.1% with a gross of $43.6 million over the three-day weekend and made a total of $64.4 million over the five-day Thanksgiving holiday weekend. In its third weekend, Breaking Dawn Part – 2 held onto the No. 1 spot again by dropping 60.1% and grossing $17.4 million. It became the third-highest-grossing film of the franchise behind Eclipse and New Moon.

Outside North America, the film opened on Wednesday, November 14, 2012, in six countries earning $13.8 million. By Thursday, it had opened in 37 territories, earning $38.8 million. In all territories, it opened with similar or higher earnings than its immediate predecessor. Through its first Friday, it earned $91.0 million, after expanding to 61 territories. By the end of its opening weekend (Wednesday–Sunday), it scored a series-best $199.5 million opening from 61 territories on 12,812 screens. This is the eighth-largest opening outside North America and the largest 2012 opening. IMAX showings generated $3 million from 82 locations. The film's largest openings were recorded in the UK, Ireland, and Malta ($25.2 million), Russia and the CIS ($22.0 million), and France and the Maghreb region ($17.9 million). In Spain, it set a three-day opening-weekend record with $11.9 million. In total earnings, its three highest-grossing markets after North America are the UK, Ireland, and Malta ($57.9 million), Brazil ($54.2 million), and Russia and the CIS ($42.8 million).

Critical response
At Rotten Tomatoes, the film has a 49% approval rating and an average score of 5.3/10 based on 200 reviews. The consensus states: "It's the most entertaining Twilight, but that's not enough to make Breaking Dawn Part 2 worth watching for filmgoers who don't already count themselves among the franchise converts." At Metacritic it has a weighted average score of 52 out of 100 based on reviews from 31 critics. Audiences polled on CinemaScore gave it an average rating of "A".

Todd McCarthy of The Hollywood Reporter wrote, "The final installment of the immortal Bella/Edward romance will give its breathlessly awaiting international audience just what it wants". Owen Gleiberman of Entertainment Weekly said, "Breaking Dawn: Part 2 starts off slow but gathers momentum, and that's because, with Bella and Edward united against the Volturi, the picture has a real threat". Sara Stewart of the New York Post wrote, "Finally, someone took the source material at its terribly written word and stopped treating the whole affair so seriously". Justin Chang of Variety praised the performance of Stewart by saying, "No longer a mopey, lower-lip-biting emo girl, this Bella is twitchy, feral, formidable and fully energized, a goddess even among her exalted bloodsucker brethren". Manohla Dargis of The New York Times said, "Despite the slow start Mr. Condon closes the series in fine, smooth style. He gives fans all the lovely flowers, conditioned hair and lightly erotic, dreamy kisses they deserve".

Roger Ebert of the Chicago Sun-Times gave the film two-and-a-half stars out of four, saying "its audience, which takes these films very seriously indeed, will drink deeply of its blood. The sensational closing sequence cannot be accused of leaving a single loophole, not even some of those we didn't know were there". He concluded by saying, ""Breaking Dawn, Part 2" must be one of the more serious entries in any major movie franchise... it bit the bullet, and I imagine fans will be pleased." Helen O'Hara of Empire gave the film a mixed review and said, "Fans will be left on a high; other viewers will be confused but generally entertained by a saga whose romance is matched only by its weirdness".

Home media
The Twilight Saga: Breaking Dawn – Part 2 was released on DVD and Blu-ray on March 2, 2013. As of June 1, 2014, Breaking Dawn: Part 2 has sold 4,810,249 DVDs along with 1,224,869 Blu-ray Discs for $71,418,469 and $24,472,107, respectively, totaling $99,195,325.

Spin-offs
In September 2016, Lionsgate co-chairman Patrick Wachsberger stated that a sequel was "a possibility", but would only go ahead if Stephenie Meyer wanted to do one. On August 8, 2017, Variety reported that Lionsgate CEO Jon Feltheimer has interest in having spinoffs made for The Twilight Saga, and wants to create a writers' room to explore the idea.

Accolades

See also
 Vampire films

References

External links

 
 
 
 
 

4 Part 2
2012 films
2010s romantic fantasy films
2010s teen romance films
American romantic fantasy films
American sequel films
American teen romance films
2010s English-language films
Films directed by Bill Condon
Films scored by Carter Burwell
Films set in Washington (state)
Films shot in Louisiana
Films shot in New Orleans
Films shot in Vancouver
IMAX films
Films with screenplays by Melissa Rosenberg
Summit Entertainment films
2010s teen fantasy films
Temple Hill Entertainment films
Films produced by Karen Rosenfelt
Films produced by Wyck Godfrey
Golden Raspberry Award winning films
2010s American films